The 1977 Norwegian Football Cup was the 72nd edition of the Norwegian annual knockout football tournament. The Cup was won by Lillestrøm after beating Bodø/Glimt in the final on 23 October 1977 with the score 1–0. This was Lillestrøm's first Norwegian Cup title.

Summary
While Third Division side Sogndal was the biggest surprise in the previous season by reaching the final, this year's surprise was Raufoss who reached the semifinal for the first time. Raufoss had eliminated the First Division sides Vålerengen, Brann and Moss, but were eliminated by Lillestrøm in the semifinal. Steinkjer, which were playing in the Second Division  eliminated Rosenborg and HamKam, but lost 3–0 against Bodø/Glimt in the semifinal. This was the second consecutive year that Steinkjer reached the semifinal.

In the final, Lillestrøm won 1–0 against Bodø/Glimt, with their biggest star, Tom Lund scoring the only goal. This was Lillestrøm's fourth final, and the first time they won the Norwegian Cup.

First round

|-
|colspan="3" style="background-color:#97DEFF"|Replay

|}

Second round

|-
|colspan="3" style="background-color:#97DEFF"|Replay

|}

Third round

|colspan="3" style="background-color:#97DEFF"|27 July 1977

|-
|colspan="3" style="background-color:#97DEFF"|28 July 1977

|-
|colspan="3" style="background-color:#97DEFF"|Replay: 4 August 1977

|}

Fourth round

|colspan="3" style="background-color:#97DEFF"|31 August 1977

|-
|colspan="3" style="background-color:#97DEFF"|Replay: 13 September 1977

|}

Quarter-finals

|colspan="3" style="background-color:#97DEFF"|21 September 1977

|-
|colspan="3" style="background-color:#97DEFF"|Replay: 28 September 1977

|-
|colspan="3" style="background-color:#97DEFF"|2nd replay: 4 October 1977

|}

Semi-finals

|colspan="3" style="background-color:#97DEFF"|5 October 1977

|-
|colspan="3" style="background-color:#97DEFF"|12 October 1977

|}

Final

References

Norwegian Football Cup seasons
Norway
Football Cup